The Leading Man is a 1996 British romantic drama film directed by John Duigan. It premiered at the Toronto International Film Festival in 1996 but was not released in the United States until March 1998. The film is set in London in the winter.

Plot
A brash American actor, Robin Grange, goes to London to feature in a major new play. The playwright of the production, Felix Webb, is having an intense affair with the leading lady, Hilary Rule. His wife of fourteen years, Elena, suspects that her husband is cheating and cannot suppress her rage. Robin comes up with an intriguing plan; to seduce Felix's elegant wife to end hassling her husband. In desperation, Felix agrees, but soon faces a dilemma in that he feels increasingly jealous of Robin's attempts to seduce his willing wife, especially when he charms (and attempts to seduce) Hilary and the other members of the production and becomes too popular at Felix's expense. Felix is caught in a web of deceit and jealousy, prompting him to seek revenge on the opening night of his new production.

Cast
 Jon Bon Jovi as Robin Grange
 Anna Galiena as Elena Webb
 Lambert Wilson as Felix Webb
 Thandiwe Newton as Hilary Rule (credited as Thandie Newton)
 Barry Humphries as Humphrey Beal
 Patricia Hodge as Delvene
 Diana Quick as Susan
 Harriet Walter as Liz Flett
 David Warner as Tod

Reception
On Rotten Tomatoes the film holds a 69% approval rating, based on 16 reviews with an average rating of 6.2/10. While enjoying performances by most of the cast, critics have given the film mixed reviews. Film4 argued about whether it is considered to be a comedy, drama or both, with neither making a large impression. The New York Times reviewed the film as "watchable without being gripping". Roger Ebert rated it 3 out of 4, "But the climax does not, I'm afraid, do justice to the setup."

Music
 The film's soundtrack is "Forever Love" by Gary Barlow.

References

External links 
 

1996 films
British romantic drama films
Films set in London
1996 romantic drama films
Films directed by John Duigan
Films scored by Edward Shearmur
1990s English-language films
1990s British films